LOT Polish Airlines, legally incorporated as Polskie Linie Lotnicze LOT S.A. (flight), is the flag carrier of Poland. Established in 1928, LOT was a founding member of IATA and remains one of the world's oldest airlines in operation. With a fleet of 79 aircraft as of 2022, LOT Polish Airlines is the 18th largest operator in Europe with over 120 destinations across Europe, Asia and North America.

The airline was founded on 29 December 1928 by the Polish government during the Second Polish Republic as a self-governing limited liability corporation, taking over existing domestic airlines Aerolot (founded in 1922) and Aero (founded in 1925), and began operations on 1 January 1929. The first aircraft used by LOT were Junkers F.13 and Fokker F.VII with the inaugural international service to Vienna, Austria, beginning on 2 August 1929.

Most of the destinations originate from its hub at Warsaw Chopin Airport. Since 2018, LOT has maintained two long-haul routes from Budapest Ferenc Liszt International Airport in Hungary where it operates regularly scheduled flights to New York during summer season and Seoul all year round. LOT has been a member of Star Alliance since 2003.

History

Pre-war LOT of the Second Republic

When the airline was founded in 1928, Poland's State Treasury had 86% shares in the line, with the rest belonging to the Province of Silesia and the city of Poznań. At the beginning of the 1930s, in addition to existing services from Warsaw to Kraków, Poznań, Gdańsk and Lwów, new service to Bydgoszcz and Katowice was introduced. In 1932, LOT began flying to Wilno. It was also at this point, in 1931, that LOT's well-renowned logo, the "Flying Crane" (designed by a visual artist from Warsaw, Tadeusz Gronowski, and still in use today) was picked as the winning entry of the airline's logo design competition.

In the same year, the company's first multi-segment international flight along the route Warsaw – Lwów – Czerniowce – Bucharest was launched. In next years there followed services to Berlin, Athens, Helsinki, Budapest, including some waypoints. By 1939 the lines were extended to Beirut, Rome, Copenhagen, reaching  of routes. The Douglas DC-2, Lockheed Model 10A Electra and Model 14H Super Electra joined the fleet in 1935, 1936 and 1938 respectively (During this period, LOT had 10 Lockheed 10, 10 Lockheed 14, 3 DC-2 and 1 Ju 52/3mge). Several Polish aircraft designs were tested, but only the single-engined PWS-24 airliner was acquired in any number. In 1934, after five years of operating under the LOT name, the airline received new head offices, technical facilities, hangars, workshops, and warehouses located at the new, modern Warsaw Okęcie Airport. This constituted a move from the airline's previous base at Pole Mokotowskie, as this airport had become impossible to operate safely due it gradually becoming absorbed into Warsaw's outlying urban and residential areas.

In 1938 LOT changed its name, following the Polish spelling reform of that year from Polskie Linje Lotnicze 'LOT' to Polskie Linie Lotnicze 'LOT'. That same year, a well-publicised transatlantic test flight from Los Angeles via Buenos Aires, Natal, Dakar to Warsaw, aimed at judging the feasibility of introducing passenger service on the Poland-United States route, was successfully executed. There were plans to open services to London and Moscow, and even transatlantic service in 1940. The airline had carried 218,000 passengers before the servies were suspended after the outbreak of the Second World War on 1 September 1939 and during the following German occupation of Poland; most of LOT's aircraft were evacuated to Romania, two to Baltic states, and three L-14H to Great Britain. In 1939 there were 697 employees, including 25 pilots, most of which were evacuated along with the planes. 13 airliners that got to Romania were seized by the Romanian government. For the duration of the Second World War, the airline suspended operations.

LOT during Polish People's Republic

After the Soviet occupation of Poland, from August 1944 until December 1945 the Polish Air Force maintained basic transport in the country; from March 1945 there were regular routes maintained by Civil Aviation Department of the Air Force. On 10 March 1945 the Polish government recreated the LOT airline, as a state-owned enterprise (Przedsiębiorstwo Państwowe Polskie Linie Lotnicze 'LOT'), which would mainly fly Soviet-built aircraft, owing to the tensions of the Cold War and Poland being a member of the Warsaw Pact. In 1946, seven years after service was first suspended, the airline restarted its operations after receiving ten Soviet-built ex-Air Force Lisunov Li-2Ts, then further passenger Li-2Ps and nine Douglas C-47s. Both domestic and international services restarted that year, first to Berlin, Paris, Stockholm and Prague. In 1947 there were added routes to Bucharest, Budapest, Belgrad and Copenhagen. 
Five modern, although troublesome SE.161 Languedoc joined the fleet for a short period in 1947–1948, followed by five Ilyushin Il-12B in 1949; 13–20 Ilyushin Il-14s then followed in 1955–1957. After the end of Stalinism in Poland, few Western aircraft would be acquired; five Convair 240s in 1957 and three Vickers Viscounts in 1962 proved to be the last until the 1990s. After that, the composition of the airline's fleet shifted exclusively to Soviet-produced aircraft. Only in 1955 LOT inaugurated services to Moscow, being the centre of the Marxist–Leninist world, and to Vienna. Services to London and Zürich were not re-established until 1958, and to Rome until 1960.

Nine Ilyushin Il-18 turboprop airliners were introduced in June 1961, leading to the establishment of routes to Africa and the Middle East, and in 1963 LOT expanded its routes to serve Cairo. In the 1970s there were added lines to Baghdad, Beirut, Benghazi, Damascus and Tunis. The Antonov An-24 was delivered from April 1966 (20 used, on domestic routes), followed by the first jet airliners Tupolev Tu-134 in November 1968 (which coincided with the opening of a new international terminal at Warsaw's Okęcie Airport). The Tu-134s were operated on European routes. The Ilyushin Il-62 long-range jet airliner inaugurate the first transatlantic routes in the history of Polish air transport to Toronto in 1972 as a charter flight and a regular flight to New York City in 1973. LOT began service on its first Far East destination – Bangkok via Dubai and Bombay in 1977.

In 1977 the airline's current livery (despite occasional changes, notably in corporate typography) designed by Roman Duszek and Andrzej Zbrożek, with the large 'LOT' inscription in blue on the front fuselage, and a blue tailplane was introduced, the 1929-designed Tadeusz Gronowski logo, however, despite many changes in livery, was kept through the years, and to this day remains the same.

In the Autumn of 1981, commercial air traffic in Poland neared collapse in the wake of the communist government's crackdown on dissenters in the country after the rise of the banned 'trade union' dissident Solidarity movement, and some Western airlines suspended their flights to Warsaw. With 13 December declaration of Martial Law that same year, all LOT connections were suspended. Charter flights to New York and Chicago resumed only in 1984, and eventually, regular flight connections were restored on 28 April 1985. Tupolev Tu-154 mid-range airliners were acquired, after the withdrawal of Il-18 and Tu-134 aircraft from LOT's fleet in the 1980s, and were deployed successively on most European and Middle East routes. In 1986 transatlantic charter flights also reached Detroit and Los Angeles.

Post-1989 LOT Polish Airlines
After the fall of the communist system in Poland in 1989 the fleet shifted back to Western aircraft, beginning with acquisitions of the Boeing 767–200 in April 1989, followed by the Boeing 767–300 in March 1990, ATR 72 in August 1991, Boeing 737–500 in December 1992 and finally the Boeing 737–400 in April 1993. From the mid-1980s to early 1990s LOT flew from Warsaw to Chicago, Edmonton, Montreal, Newark, New York City and Toronto. These routes were primarily inaugurated to serve the large Polish communities (Polonia) present in North America.

LOT was among the first Central European airlines to operate American aircraft when the Boeing 767 was introduced; the 767s were used to operate LOT's longest-ever connection, to Singapore. By the end of 1989 LOT had achieved much: it had hosted that year's IATA congress and achieved a milestone annual load-factor of 2.3 million passengers carried over the year.

In 1990 LOT's third Boeing 767–300 landed at Warsaw Chopin Airport and not long after Boeing 737 and ATR 72 aircraft were acquired for use on LOT's expanded route network, which began to include new international destinations such as Kyiv, Lviv, Minsk and Vilnius. Soon thereafter, in 1993, LOT began to expand its Western-European operations, inaugurating, in quick succession, flights to Oslo, Frankfurt and Düsseldorf; operations at Poland's other regional airports outside Warsaw were also duly expanded around this time.

In 1994 the airline signed a codesharing agreement with American Airlines on flights to and from Warsaw as well as onward flights in the United States and Poland operated by both companies; flights to Thessaloniki, Zagreb and Nice were inaugurated, and according to an IATA report, in this year LOT had the youngest fleet of any airline in the world. After years of planning, in 1997 LOT set up a sister airline, EuroLOT, which, essentially operating as its parent airline's regional subsidiary, took over domestic flights. The airline was developed with the hope that it would increase transit passenger-flow through Warsaw's Chopin Airport, whilst at the same time providing capacity on routes with smaller load factors and play a part in developing LOT's reputation as the largest transit airline in Central and Eastern Europe. By 1999 LOT had purchased a number of small Embraer 145 regional jets in order to expand its short-haul fleet, and had, with the approval of the Minister of the State Treasury, begun a process of selling shares to the Swiss company SAirGroup Holding, this then led to the airline's incorporation into the then-nascent Qualiflyer Group.

Expansion of LOT's route network continued in the early 2000s and the potential of the airline's hub at Warsaw Chopin Airport to become a major transit airport was realised with more and more success. In 2000 LOT took delivery of its largest-ever order of 11 aircraft and by 2001 had reached a milestone passengers-carried figure of 3 million customers in one year; such an expansion led to the reconstruction of much of LOT's ground infrastructure, and by 2002 a new central Warsaw head office was opened on Ul. 17 Stycznia. On 26 October 2003, LOT, after the collapse of the Qualiflyer Group, became the 14th member of the Star Alliance. By 2006 a new base of operations, with the reconstruction of Warsaw Chopin Airport, had opened, thus allowing LOT's full transit airline potential to be developed for the first time. The new airport is much larger than any previous airport in Poland. In that same year, Pope Benedict XVI returned to Rome on a LOT flight following his pilgrimage to Poland.

LOT created low-cost arm Centralwings in 2004, however, the company was dissolved and reincorporated into LOT after just five years of operating due to its long-term unprofitability and LOT's wish to redeploy aircraft within its fleet.

Recent developments

In 2008 LOT opened a new flight to Beijing, however, this lasted just a month, in the period before the Olympics. The reason for failure to continue this service was given as the need to route aircraft via an air corridor to the south of Kazakhstan (as LOT did not have permission for flights over Siberia from the Russian government) which was making the services too long and thus unprofitable.

LOT started new services to Yerevan, Armenia, Beirut, Lebanon and resumed Tallinn, Estonia, Kaliningrad, Russia, Gothenburg, Sweden and Bratislava, Slovakia with its newly acquired Embraer aircraft in summer 2010, and in October of the same year LOT resumed service to Asia, with three weekly flights on the Warsaw – Hanoi route. In addition to this, new services to Tbilisi, Damascus and Cairo were inaugurated.

In 2010 LOT cancelled flights, after 14 years of operation, between Kraków and the US destinations of Chicago and New York, citing profitability concerns and lack of demand. The last US-Kraków flight departed on 27 October 2010 from Chicago O'Hare. The aircraft previously used on this route were then re-deployed to serve LOT's Warsaw-Hanoi route. This route to Hanoi (the Vietnamese capital) was largely under-utilised by European carriers and has proved very successful for LOT in the beginning.

On 31 May 2010, CEO of LOT Sebastian Mikosz stated that the airline will be replacing its fleet to meet a goal of one-third new by 2011. Replacement already started with Embraer E-Jets 175/170. For domestic expanded operations, LOT purchased Dash 8-Q400 over ATR 72-600 aircraft.

On 5 February 2011, the new CEO of LOT, Marcin Piróg, announced that the airline was considering to open services to Baku, Sochi, Stuttgart, Oslo, Gothenburg, Dubai, Kuwait and Ostrava from its Warsaw hub in the near future. Previously planned flights to Donetsk in Ukraine had already been inaugurated, as had Tokyo, and the resumption of Beijing flights. This became feasible since the finalizing of an agreement on Siberian overflight permits for LOT by the Polish and Russian governments in November 2011. As a result of the new agreement, LOT received new take-off and landing slots at Moscow's Sheremetyevo International Airport. Although delayed from the original plans, LOT began flights to Tokyo on 13 January 2016, with flights three times per week.

In 2010/11 LOT also announced its new 'East meets West' route expansion policy, which saw the airline add several new Asian destinations to its schedule over the coming years. The policy aimed to take advantage of LOT's perspectives as a transit airline and the substantial passenger growth seen on Europe-Asia flights in recent years. Also, in line with this policy LOT introduced premium economy class on all Boeing 787 aircraft. Additionally, lie-flat seats are available in business class and all of the airline's new long-haul aircraft have been fitted with Thales personal entertainment systems.

In June 2012 LOT announced all services to New York would be centralized from Newark and JFK Terminal 4 to JFK Terminal 1 from October 2012. It would also enter into a codeshare agreement with JetBlue to increase the number of onward connections available to its customers.
In July 2012 it was announced that a planned sale of a major stake in the airline to Turkish Airlines would not go ahead. The main problem was the inability of Turkish Airlines to own a majority stake as it is a non-European Union company.

Amidst a restructuring plan which saw the airline return to profitability for the first time in seven years, a 22 June 2015 press conference revealed details about the airline's prospects. These include reinstating routes renounced as part of EU sanctions imposed following Polish government aid granted to ensure the airline's survival, as well as new long haul routes to Asia and North America.

Air Lease Corporation confirmed on 13 October 2016, the placement of six Boeing 737 MAX 8 aircraft with LOT, and options to lease five further aircraft of the same type. Long haul plans saw the addition of further Boeing 787 aircraft, increasing the total to 16. The airline is currently evaluating the economics of future narrow body and wide body acquisitions to broaden expansion initiatives. The airline's CEO stated they are evaluating the Airbus A220 and Embraer E-Jet-E2 families, as well as the Boeing 787 Dreamliner and Airbus A350 XWB offerings.

In May 2018, LOT Polish Airlines started scheduled flights from outside Poland beginning with long-haul routes to New York and Chicago from Budapest airport in Hungary. In May 2019, it started flying from Lithuanian capital Vilnius to London City airport and from Estonian capital Tallinn to Brussels and Stockholm two months later. The latter two flights were suspended in early 2020 due to coronavirus pandemic

On January 24, 2020, Owner of LOT, the Polish Aviation Group (Polska Grupa Lotnicza or PGL) announced that it would acquire Condor Flugdienst. On 2 April 2020 it was announced that the sale had fallen through.

The company temporarily suspended operations on 15 March 2020 due to the COVID-19 pandemic, and domestic Polish flights restarted only on 1 June 2020, while international flights were resumed on a very limited basis from 1 July 2020.

In July 2021, LOT Polish Airlines recorded a net loss of US$365.2 million in 2020, with a loss on sales of $138.1 million.

Corporate affairs

Privatisation

Currently, the airline is wholly owned by Polish Aviation Group (Polish: Polska Grupa Lotnicza S. A.), a Polish state-owned holding company.

LOT was intended to be privatised in 2011. Although advanced talks were undertaken with Turkish Airlines a deal failed to materialise. This was largely due to the inability of Turkish Airlines, as a non-EU airline, to buy a majority of the airline. LOT lost 145.5 million złote (PLN) in 2011, compared to a 163.1 million PLN loss in 2010.

LOT saw a return to profitability in 2016, with profits of 183.5 million and more than 280 million PLN respectively. The profits led the then finance minister Mateusz Morawiecki to suggest they were a result of his government's policies. He also accused the previous Civic Platform government of leading the airline to either bankruptcy or "accelerated privatisation".

Subsidiaries
Current subsidiaries
 LOT Charters, wholly owned subsidiary operating charter flights for Polish tour operators.
 LOT Flight Academy

Former subsidiaries
 Nordica, 49% stake was owned by LOT between 2016 and 2020.
 EuroLOT, a formerly wholly owned subsidiary airline, founded on 1 July 1997. The Polish Treasury owned 62.1 percent while LOT retained 37.9 percent. However, it was confirmed in July 2012 that LOT wished to sell its remaining stake in EuroLOT, as part of its privatization scheme. However, on 6 February 2015, the decision was taken to liquidate the airline and transfer the majority of its fleet to LOT. 
 Centralwings, a low-cost subsidiary that was operational between 2004 and 2009.

Destinations

Polish Airlines LOT has a dense European network in addition to flights in Asia, the Middle East, and North America.

Codeshare agreements
LOT Polish Airlines has codeshare agreements with the following airlines:
 Aegean Airlines
 Aeroflot
 Air Astana
 airBaltic
 Air Canada
 Air China
 Air India
 Air Moldova
 Air New Zealand
 All Nippon Airways
 Asiana Airlines
 Austrian Airlines
 Croatia Airlines
 EgyptAir
 El Al
 Lufthansa
 Luxair
 Scandinavian Airlines
 Singapore Airlines
 Swiss International Air Lines
 TAP Air Portugal
 Turkish Airlines
 United Airlines
 JetBlue

Fleet

Current fleet
, LOT Polish Airlines operates the following aircraft:

Historic fleet

Fleet development
 On 7 September 2005, the airline ordered seven Boeing 787-8s (with two options and five purchase rights) for its long-haul operations. On 19 February 2007 the airline converted one option to make a total of eight 787s on order. On 7 March 2011 Boeing officially notified LOT Polish Airlines that the delivery of the 787 would be delayed for another year. The airline planned to use the 787 on its Warsaw-Chicago route on 16 January 2013, but the type was grounded on that same day due to issues with its batteries. On 25 April 2013, LOT announced that it would resume its 787 services on 5 June 2013.
 On 4 May 2010, LOT converted four Embraer E-175 orders to Embraer E-195 orders. The delivery of these aircraft began in March 2011.
 On 8 June 2010, the Ministry of National Defence of the Republic of Poland leased two E175 aircraft from LOT to transport senior government officials on short/medium-haul flights until the end of 2018.
 In 2016 the airline signed contracts for eleven leased Boeing 737 MAX 8 aircraft (six firm commitments and five options), with deliveries starting in late 2017.
 On 24 April 2018, LOT announced the purchase of three additional Boeing 787–9 aircraft, bringing the total of the −9 variant to seven of the fifteen Boeing 787s expected to be in the fleet by October 2019.
 On 15 July 2022, LOT announced that they are favoring the Airbus A220 as opposed to the Embraer E-Jet E2 family to replace its current aging Embraer Regional Jet fleet, with a 60 jet order valuing US$2.1 Billion

Corporate identity
With the delivery of new Boeing 787 long-haul aircraft in 2011/12, LOT introduced a new livery. This design was intended to retain the tradition and spirit of LOT with no major or radical changes to the livery applied to the airline's aircraft. The blue nose and broad cheat-line were removed; the 'POLSKIE LINIE LOTNICZE' title on each aircraft's starboard side was replaced with the words 'POLISH AIRLINES'. The tailplane's design was changed only slightly, with the colours of the traditional encircled crane logo being inverted and the circle becoming a more simple outline ring.

Several Embraer aircraft have special advertising liveries, while one E-175 was repainted as a retrojet into the 1945 livery that was used with some modifications until the 1970s.

Livery 1935–1939, 1945–1956
Airliners featured all-natural metal silvery color, with a black crane logo on the tail, and a small black inscription: POLSKIE LINIE LOTNICZE „LOT" under or above the window line. Before 1939, there was also a rounded inscription: LOT above passenger doors (apart from Ju 52, which also differed in having black engine covers and nacelles).

After World War II, the aircraft mostly wore a similar all-natural metal scheme, with the airline name above the window line. In the late 1940s, the Polish white and red flag was added on a rudder. From the early 1950s, a thin blue cheatline was introduced below the window line, starting with a stylized bird in front. Some aircraft flew in military schemes (green and light blue or olive drab and grey).

Livery 1956–1976
This livery featured blue mid-level broad cheatline on the window line, with the fuselage a white colour above the cheatline and unpainted below. Early versions of this livery also featured thin blue stripes above and below the cheatline and a white tail, with small black crane logo on the fin and medium-size Polish flag on the rudder. Above the cheatline there was black inscription in italics: POLSKIE LINIE LOTNICZE »LOT«. There was also a long black stylized crane below the cockpit on most aircraft. In the early 1960s, the scheme was modernized and featured the blue cheatline without upper and lower stripes, and a blue tail fin and rudder. The Polish flag was much larger on the tail, while the crane logo was above the flag, on a white circle. There was also another Polish flag on the cheatline, behind the cockpit. On Il-18s and Il-62s, the cheatline was narrower, below the window line.

Livery 1977–2010s
LOT's iconic livery was introduced in 1977 and has undergone no major changes. The livery is essentially a predominantly white scheme with elements of traditional aviation design incorporated. The latter elements were visible in the design of the LOT livery as an area of dark blue under the cockpit windscreen, the long cheat-line painted down the side of the fuselage and the large traditional logo which is emblazoned on the tailplane.

Aircraft naming
Ilyushin Il-62 aircraft were named after famous Polish people, with the first-named Mikołaj Kopernik. The five Boeing 767s LOT ordered from Boeing were named after Polish cities. The used and short term leased 767s LOT operated did not get names. This practise was not continued upon arrival of LOT's Boeing 787s and the introduction of the airline's updated livery.

Loyalty programme and lounges

Miles & More

LOT uses Lufthansa's frequent-flyer program, called Miles & More. Miles & More members can earn miles on LOT flights and Star Alliance partner flights, as well as through LOT credit cards and purchases made through LOT Polish Airlines shops. Status within Miles & More is determined by miles flown during one calendar year with specific partners. Membership levels include Basic (no minimal threshold), Frequent Traveller (Silver, 35,000-mile threshold), Senator (Gold, 100,000-mile threshold), and HON Circle (Black, 600,000-mile threshold over two calendar years). All non-basic Miles & More status levels offer lounge access and executive bonus miles, with the higher levels offering more exclusive benefits.

Polonez Lounge
LOT operates, in cooperation with PPL (Polish State Airports), the 'Polonez' Business Lounge at Warsaw Chopin Airport. The lounge is accessible to anyone with a business class ticket for travel with LOT or any other Star Alliance member airline, and those who are members of a Star Alliance 'Gold' loyalty program (such as Miles & More Senator status) or the Polish State Airports authority's 'Good Start' program. Some examples of services offered to passengers include business conferencing facilities, internet access, workspace, local, national and foreign-language media (newspapers and television) and individual access to an Apple iPad. LOT also opened a Polonez Lounge at Budapest Ferenc Liszt International Airport in 2018.

Accidents

Fatal
 On 1 December 1936, a LOT Lockheed Model 10 Electra (registered SP-AYB) hit a tree near Malakasa in Greece due to fog; a pilot was killed, six people were injured.
 On 28 December 1936, a LOT Lockheed Model 10 Electra (registered SP-AYA) crashed near Susiec in Poland due to icing; two passengers and a mechanic died, three people were injured.
 On 11 November 1937, a LOT Lockheed Model 10 Electra (registered SP-AYD) crashed near Warsaw during its landing approach in bad weather, causing the death of four passengers.
 On 23 November 1937, a LOT Douglas DC-2-115D (registered SP-ASJ) crashed in Bulgaria's Pirin Mountains in bad weather, killing all six on board. The aircraft was operating a scheduled Thessaloniki-Sofia passenger service.
 On 22 July 1938 at 17:38 local time, a LOT Lockheed 14H Super Electra (registered SP-BNG) crashed into a hill at Negrilesa, near Stulpicani, Romania, killing all 14 on board; the cause of the crash was unknown, but the aircraft was probably struck by lightning. The aircraft was operating a scheduled Warsaw-Lwów (now Lviv)-Czerniowce (now Chernovtsy)-Bucharest-Thessaloniki passenger service.
 On 15 November 1951 at approximately 09:00 local time, a LOT Lisunov Li-2 (registered SP-LKA) crashed near Tuszyn in bad weather and low visibility conditions, killing all 15 passengers and three crew on board. The aircraft had been on a scheduled flight from Łódź to Kraków.
 One passenger died on 19 March 1954, when a LOT Li-2 (registered SP-LAH) collided with a hill near Gruszowiec following the blackout of a radio navigation beacon.
 On 14 June 1957 at 23:10 local time, Flight 232 from Warsaw to Moscow, which was operated by using an Ilyushin Il-14 (registered SP-LNF) crashed during approach to Moscow's Vnukovo International Airport in bad weather and visibility conditions, killing five of the eight passengers and four of the five crew members.
 On 25 August 1960, a LOT Li-2 (registered SP-LAL) crashed near Tczew while on a survey flight over the Vistula River floods, killing six.
 On 19 December 1962, a LOT Vickers Viscount 804 (registered SP-LVB) crashed while on approach to Warsaw-Okecie Airport after having encountered a stall situation, killing all 28 passengers and five crew members on board. The aircraft had been on a scheduled flight from Brussels to Warsaw with an intermediate stop at East Berlin.
 On 20 August 1965 at 13:08 UTC, another LOT Vickers Viscount (registered SP-LVA) crashed near Jeuk, Belgium, during a thunderstorm on a ferry flight from Lille in France to Wrocław. The four people in the aircraft were killed.
 On 2 April 1969 at 16:08 local time, a LOT Antonov An-24W (registered SP-LTF), crashed into Polica, a mountain near Zawoja. The aircraft with 48 passengers and five crew on board had been operating Flight 165 from Warsaw to Kraków when the pilots lost orientation because of a snowstorm. There were no survivors.
 On 13 May 1977, a LOT Antonov An-12 (registered SP-LZA) operating a cargo flight from Warsaw to Beirut via Varna crashed at approximately 08:45 local time near Aramoun, Lebanon, killing all nine people on board, some of whom were agents of the communist Polish secret service. The aircraft had been approaching Beirut International Airport, but the pilots had encountered language difficulties when communicating with the local air traffic controllers. The aircraft was the property of the Polish Air Force and was flown by military pilots and had previously transported weapons for the Lebanese Civil War, when it crashed it was carrying a cargo of veal.
 On 14 March 1980 at around 11:00 local time, LOT Flight 007 from New York City to Warsaw crashed during a landing attempt at Warsaw-Okecie Airport, killing all 77 passengers and 10 crew members on board the Ilyushin Il-62 (registration SP-LAA), including singer Anna Jantar. The pilots had encountered a landing gear problem and began the standard go-around procedure, during which a shaft in the no. 2 engine disintegrated, damaging the rudder and elevator control lines, and causing the aircraft to enter an uncontrolled dive.
 On 26 March 1981, a LOT An-24 (registered SP-LTU) crash-landed near Słupsk after the crew lost situational awareness during a non-precision twin locator approach, killing one passenger. The other 46 passengers and four crew survived, leaving the aircraft through a breach in the fuselage. The fatality was a passenger whose legs were trapped under broken seats and who died in the post-crash fire.
 On 9 May 1987 at 11:12 local time, LOT Flight 5055, bound from Warsaw to New York, crashed in the Kabaty forest about 5 km from the Warsaw-Okęcie Airport, killing all 172 passengers and 11 crew, making it the deadliest accident in the history of the airline and the country. The aircraft involved was another Ilyushin Il-62 (registration SP-LBG) whose number-2 (left-side inner) engine exploded, igniting a fire in the cargo hold and irreparably damaging all but one of the aircraft's control systems. The pilots attempted a return to Warsaw-Okecie Airport, but lost control of the aircraft before it entered a steep nose-dive due to damage to the elevators.
 On 2 November 1988, LOT Flight 703 had to execute an emergency landing on a field near Rzeszów following an engine failure, killing one passenger. The other 24 passengers and four crew on board the An-24 (registered SP-LTD) survived, though most of them received serious injuries.

Other incidents and accidents
 On 18 August 1938, a LOT Lockheed 14H Super Electra (registered SP-BNJ) was destroyed by a fire in Bucharest after one of its tires burst and the left wing struck the ground.
 On 24 July 1940, a LOT Lockheed 14H2 Super Electra (registered SP-BPK) was deliberately crashed at Bucharest; the aircraft was sold to LOT on 20 March 1939 and seized by Romania on 2 September 1939 at the outbreak of World War II.
 On 26 May 1948, a LOT Lisunov Li-2T (registered SP-LBC) was written off near Popowice.
 On 28 March 1950, a LOT Douglas DC-3 (registered SP-LCC) was damaged beyond repair in a crash landing.
 Only one day later, on 29 March 1950, the airline lost another aircraft (a Lisunov Li-2, registration SP-LBA) in a crash.
 On 19 May 1952, a LOT Li-2 (registered SP-LBD) was damaged beyond repair in a crash landing near Sowina.
 On 18 July of the same year, an Ilyushin Il-12 (registered SP-LHC) was written off in crash landing at Warsaw-Okecie Airport.
 On 15 March 1953, a LOT Douglas DC-3 (registered SP-LCH) crashed near Katowice.
 On 14 April 1955, a Lisunov Li-2 (SP-LAE) crashed near Katowice, with none of the 15 persons on board being killed.
 On 11 April 1958, a LOT Convair CV-240 (registered SP-LPB) crash-landed near Warsaw and was damaged beyond repair after it had lost one propeller in mid-flight. There were only four people on board who had operated a training flight with the aircraft; all of them survived.
 On 16 December 1963, a Lisunov Li-2T (registered SP-LBG) was damaged beyond repair when it overshot the runway on landing at Warsaw-Okecie Airport. The twelve passengers and three crew on board survived.
 On 24 January 1969 at 17:30 local time, a LOT Antonov An-24 (registered SP-LTE) collided with trees during a landing attempt at Wrocław in poor visibility conditions, and crashed. The aircraft had been operating Flight 149 from Warsaw with 44 passengers and four crew members on board, all of whom survived.
 On 19 April 1973, an Antonov An-24 (registered SP-LTN) crashed during a training flight near Rzeszów.
 On 23 January 1980, a Tupolev Tu-134 (registered SP-LGB) was damaged beyond repair when it overshot the runway on landing at Warsaw-Okecie Airport and erupted in flames.
 On 31 December 1993 at 10:20 local time, a Boeing 767-300ER (registered SP-LPA) operating Flight 2 from Chicago to Warsaw received substantial damage to its nose gear in a hard landing incident at Warsaw Chopin Airport.
 On 1 November 2011 a Boeing 767-300ER (registered SP-LPC) operating as Flight 16 from Newark Liberty International Airport to Warsaw Chopin Airport reported the failure of the hydraulic system that operated the flaps and landing gear. When the backup system was activated, only the flaps were operable. All attempts to lower the landing gear failed, including one last attempt using gravity; forcing a gear-up landing on runway 33 at Warsaw Chopin, which is exceptionally rare for modern airliners to do. The aircraft, captained by Tadeusz Wrona, managed to make a successful gear-up landing with no injuries or fatalities. The aircraft was written off, and runway 15/33 at Chopin Airport was shut for some time to repair the damage sustained on the runway, including some lights that were destroyed when the aircraft slid over them.
 On 10 January 2018 a Bombardier Dash 8 Q400 (SP-EQG) operating as LO3924 from Krakow to Warsaw reported landing gear issues. Warsaw Chopin Airport was shut down for four hours after an emergency landing there around 19:30 local time with a failed nose gear. There were no reported injuries to 59 passengers on board.

Communist-era hijacking asylum attempts
During the Cold War, when Europe was divided by the Iron Curtain, several LOT aircraft were hijacked and forced to land in a Western country, predominantly in West Germany and especially in West Berlin, because of it being situated like an island in the Eastern Bloc. The hijackers were usually not prosecuted there but could claim political asylum, along with all other passengers who wished to do so.
 On 16 September 1949, five armed people forced a LOT flight from Gdańsk to Łódź to divert to Nyköping in Sweden.
 On 16 December of the same year, another aircraft on the same route was hijacked, this time it diverted to Bornholm Airport in Denmark. Of the 15 passengers and three crew members on board, 16 decided to claim political asylum.
 On 16 October 1969, a LOT Antonov An-24 (registered SP-LTK) was hijacked by two passengers en route a flight from Warsaw to East Berlin and forced to divert to Berlin Tegel Airport, serving West Berlin.
 Another hijacking of a LOT An-24 occurred on 20 November of the same year, this time on a flight from Wrocław to Bratislava, when two passengers forced the pilots to land at Vienna International Airport.
 On 5 June 1970, a LOT An-24 with 24 people on board was hijacked during a flight from Szczecin to Gdańsk and forced to land at Copenhagen Airport in Denmark, where police forces stormed the aircraft and arrested the perpetrator. 
 On 9 June 1970, another hijacking attempt occurred on a LOT flight from Katowice to Warsaw, but the two persons involved were overpowered.
 On 7 August 1970, one passenger on board a LOT An-24 flying from Szczecin to Katowice forced the pilots to divert to Germany. As he did not specify his demands any further, the aircraft landed at Berlin Schönefeld Airport in East Germany, where he was arrested.
 On 19 August 1970, five passengers on board a LOT Ilyushin Il-14 en route a scheduled flight from Gdańsk to Warsaw forced the pilots to divert to Bornholm Airport in Denmark.
 On 26 August 1970, three persons on board a LOT An-24 on a flight from Katowice to Warsaw demanded to be taken to Austria. The pilots returned the aircraft to Katowice Airport instead, where the perpetrators were arrested.
 On 4 November 1976, a LOT Tupolev Tu-134 (registered SP-LHD) was forced by two passengers to leave its scheduled route from Copenhagen to Warsaw and land at Vienna International Airport instead, where they surrendered to local police forces.
 On 24 April 1977 another LOT Tu-134 (registered SP-LGA) was hijacked, this time on a flight from Kraków to Nuremberg in West Germany. The pilots returned to Kraków-Balice Airport, where the aircraft was stormed and the hijacker arrested. 
 Another hijacking attempt was suppressed on 18 October 1977 on board a LOT An-24 (registered SP-LTH) en route from Katowice to Warsaw.
 On 30 August 1978, Flight 165 en route from Gdańsk to East Berlin was hijacked by two East German citizens who forced the pilots to land the Tu-134 involved (registered SP-LGC) at Berlin Tempelhof Airport in West Berlin. Apart from the hijackers, another six people decided to claim political asylum, thus making it one of the largest successful escapes over the Berlin Wall.
 On 4 December 1980, a LOT An-24 (registered SP-LTB) was hijacked during a flight from Zielona Góra to Warsaw and forced to land at Berlin-Tegel Airport. 
 SP-LTB was involved in another hijacking attempt on 10 January 1981, when four passengers demanded to be taken to a Western country during a flight from Katowice to Warsaw. This time, the pilots continued to Warsaw-Okecie Airport, though, where the perpetrators were arrested.
 An Antonov An-24 (registered SP-LTI) was forced to land at Tempelhof Airport in West Berlin on 21 July 1981, after having been hijacked during a flight from Katowice to Gdańsk. 
 On 5 August 1981, another hijacking attempt occurred on board SP-LTI while it was flying from Katowice to Gdańsk, but the perpetrator was restrained and arrested upon landing at Gdańsk Airport. 
 On 11 August, another hijacking attempt on the Katowice to Gdańsk route was foiled, again on an Antonov An-24 (registered SP-LTT).
 On 22 August 1981, a hijacker succeeded in his demands that the aircraft involved (an An-24 registered SP-LTC) be diverted to West Berlin's Tegel Airport from its original route from Wrocław to Warsaw. 
 On 18 September 1981 twelve passengers rioted on board an Antonov An-24 (registered SP-LTG) on a flight from Katowice to Warsaw and demanded the aircraft be diverted to West Berlin. A Mil Mi-8 helicopter of the Soviet military tried to intercept the aircraft before landing at Tegel Airport, but failed to do so. 
 On 22 September four passengers tried to hijack a LOT flight from Warsaw to Koszalin, but the pilots returned the An-24 (registered SP-LTK) to Warsaw-Okecie Airport instead, where the perpetrators were arrested. 
 A week later on 29 September 1981, one hijacker demanded an Antonov An-12 (registered SP-LTP) on a flight from Warsaw to Szczecin be diverted to West Berlin; again the pilots landed the aircraft in Warsaw.
 On 30 April 1982, eight passengers forced a LOT An-24 (registered SP-LTG), that was operating a flight from Wrocław to Warsaw, to divert to Berlin-Tegel Airport.
 On 9 June 1982, two hijackers on board a LOT flight from Katowice to Warsaw demanded the pilots to divert to West Germany. Instead, the aircraft landed in Poland and the perpetrators were arrested.
 On 25 August 1982, two passengers forced the LOT flight from Budapest to Warsaw, that was operated using an Ilyushin Il-18 (registered SP-LSI) to divert to Munich Riem Airport. 
 On 22 November 1982 the flight from Wrocław to Warsaw (operated by an An-24 registered SP-LTK) was forced to land at Berlin-Tempelhof Airport.

Other
 On 25 February 1993, a man forced his way into a LOT ATR 72 (registered SP-LFA) at Rzeszów-Jasionka Airport during the boarding process for Flight 702 to Warsaw, threatening to detonate a hand grenade. Police special forces stormed the aircraft in which there was a total number 30 of people at the time of the assault. The perpetrator (who proved to be unarmed) was shot at and overpowered.

See also
 Transport in Poland
 List of airlines
 LOT Charters 
 Nordica (airline)

References

External links

 
 

 
Airlines of Poland
Airlines established in 1929
Association of European Airlines members
Companies based in Warsaw
Polish brands
Government-owned airlines
Government-owned companies of Poland
Star Alliance
1929 establishments in Poland